The 2019 Peach Bowl (known for sponsorship reasons as the 2019 Chick-Fil-A Peach Bowl) was a college football bowl game played on December 28, 2019, at Mercedes-Benz Stadium in Atlanta, with kickoff at 4:00 p.m. EST on ESPN. It was the 52nd edition of the Peach Bowl, and was one of the 2019–20 bowl games concluding the 2019 FBS football season. The Peach Bowl was one of two College Football Playoff semifinal games, which pitted the two of the four teams selected by the College Football Playoff Selection Committee—Oklahoma of the Big 12, and LSU from the SEC, with the winner advancing to face the winner of the Fiesta Bowl in the 2020 College Football Playoff National Championship. LSU dominated Oklahoma, with the score 49-14 at the half. They won, 63-28, in the first CFP game to have a team score 60+ points. Sponsored by restaurant chain Chick-fil-A, the game was officially known as the College Football Playoff Semifinal at the Chick-fil-A Peach Bowl.

College Football Playoff

Teams
This was the third meeting between Oklahoma and LSU.  The series was tied 1–1; Oklahoma won the 1950 Sugar Bowl, 35–0, while LSU won the 2004 Sugar Bowl, 21–14.

Oklahoma Sooners

Oklahoma defeated Baylor in the 2019 Big 12 Championship Game on December 7, then received their bid to the Peach Bowl with the release of final CFP rankings on December 8. The Sooners entered the bowl with a 12–1 record (8–1 in conference); their only loss was to Kansas State, 48–41. This was Oklahoma's first appearance in the Peach Bowl, and their fourth College Football Playoff appearance.  Oklahoma was 0–3 in prior CFP semifinals, most recently losing to Alabama in the 2018 Orange Bowl.

On December 18, media outlets reported that starting defensive end Ronnie Perkins and two other Oklahoma players had received suspensions and would not play in the game. On December 20, it was reported that starting safety Delarrin Turner-Yell would also miss the game, due to a broken collarbone. On December 23, head coach Lincoln Riley confirmed that Perkins and the two other players would not play, and said that he did not expect Turner-Yell to play.

LSU Tigers

LSU defeated Georgia in the 2019 SEC Championship Game on December 7, then received their bid to the Peach Bowl with the release of final CFP rankings on December 8. The Tigers entered the bowl with a 13–0 record (8–0 in conference). In six prior Peach Bowl appearances, the Tigers were 5–1, with their only defeat coming in their most recent appearance, a 2012 loss to Clemson in the then-Chick-fil-A Bowl. This was LSU's first College Football Playoff semifinal appearance.

Game summary

Statistics

Joe Burrow threw seven touchdown passes in the first half, tying the NCAA records for touchdown passes in a half and touchdown passes in a bowl game. Four of the touchdowns were to Justin Jefferson, who set the College Football Playoff record for touchdown catches and the Peach Bowl record for receiving yards (227).

References

External links

Game statistics at statbroadcast.com

Peach Bowl
Peach Bowl
Peach Bowl
Oklahoma Sooners football bowl games
LSU Tigers football bowl games
Peach Bowl
Peach Bowl
2019 in Atlanta